Harut and Marut are two angels mentioned in Quran 2:102, who are said to have been located in Babylon. According to some narratives, those two angels were in the time of Idris. The Quran indicates that they were a trial for the people and through them the people were tested with sorcery. The story itself parallels a Jewish legend about the fallen angels Shemḥazaī, ʿUzza, and ʿAzaʾel. The names Hārūt and Mārūt appear to be etymologically related to those of Haurvatat and Ameretat, two Zoroastrian archangels. Haurvatat-Ameretat (Pahlavi hrwdʼd ʼmwrdʼd) appears in Sogdian language texts as hrwwt mrwwt. A relationship to Armenian hawrot mawrot has been suggested but is not confirmed. Muslim sources disagree, whether Harut and Marut can be considered fallen angels or not.

Quranic narrative 
In the Quran, the two angels are briefly mentioned as follows:

Tafsir

Tabari 
Tabari offers different narrations linking back to the sahaba. Although differing in detail, the story can be summarized as follows:

The angels were astonished at the acts of disobedience committed by the human beings on earth, claiming they would do better than them. Therefore, God challenged the angels to choose two representatives among them, who would descend to earth and be endowed with bodily desires. During their stay on earth, they fell in love with a woman named Zohra (often identified with Venus). She told them she would become intimate with them if they joined her in idolatry and tell her how to ascend to heaven. The angels refused and remained pious. Later they met her again and the woman this time stated she would become intimate with them if they drank alcohol. The angels thought that alcohol could not cause great harm and therefore, they accepted the condition. After they were drunk, they became intimate with her and after noticing a witness, they killed them. On the next day, Harut and Marut regretted their deeds but could not ascend to heaven anymore due to their sins, as their link to the angels was broken. Thereupon, God asked them, either their punishment shall be in this world or in the hereafter. They chose to be punished on earth and therefore were sent to Babel as a test, teaching humans magic but not without warning them that they were just a temptation.

Ibn Kathir 
The 14th-century scholar Ibn Kathir gives an alternative version of Harut and Marut. Although regarding their story as sound in chain of narrations, but since it goes back to Ibn Abbas and not to Muhammad himself, he asserts Muslims should not follow this narrative. Instead he goes into depth about what exactly the angels had taught to the people in his book, Stories of the Qur'an:

Narrated Al-`Ufi in his interpretation on the authority of Ibn `Abbas (May Allah be pleased with him) pertaining to Allah's Statement {They followed what the Shayatin (devils) gave out (falsely of the magic) in the lifetime of Sulaiman (Solomon). Sulaiman did not disbelieve, but the Shayatin (devils) disbelieved, teaching men magic and such things that came down at Babylon to the two angels, Harut and Marut but neither of these two (angels) taught anyone (such things) till they had said, "We are only for trial, so disbelieve not (by learning this magic from us)." ...} When Sulaiman lost his kingdom, great numbers from among mankind and the jinn renegaded and followed their lusts. But, when Allah restored to Sulaiman his kingdom and the renegade came to follow the Straight Path once again, Sulaiman seized their holy scriptures which he buried underneath his throne. Shortly after, Sulaiman (Peace be upon him) died. In no time, the men and the Jinn uncovered the buried scriptures and said: This was a book revealed by Allah to Sulaiman who hid it from us. They took it as their religion and Allah the Almighty revealed His Saying: {And when there came to them a Messenger from Allah confirming what was with them, a party of those who were given the Scripture threw away the Book of Allah behind their backs as if they did not know!}. (Al-Baqarah, 101) and they followed what the devils gave out, i.e. all that blocks the remembrance of Allah.

Angelic impeccability status 

The story of Harut and Marut posed a major problem for the doctrine of infallible angels. Although angels are not necessarily impeccable in Islam, many scholars teach that angels are mere messengers of God without free-will, thus unable to error. 

Some Islamic exegetes deny that Harut and Marut were angels at all and prefer to regard them as ordinary men rather than angels, who learned magic from devils. In Hasan al-Basri's view, it was impossible that angels would teach sins like magic. This view also supported by his fellow Tabi'un scholars, Ibn Shihab al-Zuhri, and Qatada ibn al-Nu'man, who also rejected the notion that angels like Harut and Marut could transgress and commit sins. This view is also shared by modern Salafi-scholars who reject the notion that Harut and Marut have been punished by God. 

Others accept Harut and Marut as angels, but reject their associated story. Hasan ibn Ali ibn Muhammad, the 11th Imam of the Twelver Shi'ah, after being asked about the truth of the story, refuted the belief that angels may emerge as transgressors, because, he reasoned, they lack freedom to act upon their will and just rely on the Will of God. Pertaining to the Quran's statement: "To Him belongs whatever is in the heavens and the earth, and those who are near Him do not disdain to worship Him, nor do they become weary. They glorify [Him] night and day, and they do not flag," he argued that if Harut and Marut had committed oppression and injustice, how could they have been God's representative or messenger on earth? 

Ahmad ibn Hanbal (780–855 CE), accepted that Harut and Marut might be fallen angels and argues that general angelic impeccability is the reason for their transgression. Especially due to the obedience of angels, they begin to oppose the children of Adam, leading to their fall in the first place, thus combining the Quranic statement about angels complaining over the creation of Adam, with the verse concerning Harut and Marut.Al-Taftazani (1322 AD –1390 AD) states in his 'Aqaid al-Nasafi that angels might inadvertently fall into error, but can not become unbelievers. He affirms that Harut and Marut are indeed angels, who taught magic, but they never approved it, therefore have not sinned. He rejects Iblis's angelic nature however. Harut and Marut are not described as fallen but rebuked. Al-Damiri (1341–1405) argues, that the story of Harut and Marut were unreliable and supports his view by statements from Hasan Al Basri and Ibn Abbas, however accepts that Iblis had been an angel once. He uses this argument to refute the claim that the Jurhum were descendants of a fallen angel. In Rumis major work Masnavi, the reader is recommended to remember the story of Harut and Marut, and how their self-righteousness led to their demise. On the other hand, Al-Kalbi (737 AD – 819 AD) reconciled the Quranic narrative with earlier non-Islamic sources, mentioning three angels descending to earth, and giving them the names from the  Third Book of Enoch. He explained that one of them returned to heaven, because he repents his sin and the other two changed on earth their names to Harut and Marut. 

According to Muslim scholar Ansar Al-'Adl, many interpretations of the verse originated from alleged Judeo-Christian sources that came to be recorded in some works of Quranic exegesis, called Tafsir. Numerous stories have been transmitted about these verses, yet all center around the same basic story. Although not explained by the Quran itself, Muslim exegetes, such as Al-Kalbi and Al-Tha`labi, usually linked the reason of their abode to a narration related to the Watchers known from 3 Enoch. Just as in 3 Enoch, angels complained about humans iniquity, whereupon God offered a test, that the angels might choose three among them to descend to earth, endowed with bodily desires, and prove that they would do better than humans under the same conditions. Accordingly, they choose Aza, Azzaya and Azazel. However, Azazel repented his decision and God allowed him to turn back to heaven. The other two angels failed the test and their names were changed to Harut and Marut. They ended up on earth, introducing men to illicit magic. 

Abdullah Yusuf Ali, translator of the Qur'an into English, asserts that the source of this story may be the Jewish Midrash:

Among the Jewish traditions in the Midrash was a story of two angels who asked Allah's permission to come down to earth but succumbed to temptation, and were hung up by their feet at Babylon for punishment.  Such stories about sinning angels who were cast down to punishment were believed in by the early Christians, also (see II Peter 2:4, and Epistle of Jude, verse 6). Contrary, most recent research in the field of Islamic Studies has established that the earliest possible date for the Midrash dealing with the Harut & Marut narrative, dates from the 11th century and thus postdates the advent of Islam by more than 400 years:

Careful comparison of the developed narratives of the "Tale of Harut and Marut" and the Midrash amid the larger literary corpora within which they are embedded suggests that the Muslim Harut wa-Marut complex both chronologically and literarily precedes the articulated versions of the Jewish Midrash. What is likely the oldest Hebrew form of the story dates from approximately the eleventh century, several hundred years after the bulk of the Muslim evidence. 
 
Similarly, Patricia Crone argues, that the Midrash actually adapted the story from Muslims, but the names were changed to Azazel and Samyaza, terms for fallen angels in other earlier Jewish scriptures, however, regarded as unauthentic by Rabbinic Judaism.

Sadr al-Din al-Shirazi believes that angels are regarded as mujarradat who are "intrinsically intelligible" and free from the limitations of material existence. A mujarrad being, as described by Shirazi, is not necessarily something "that exists as an abstraction in the mind". It can be a concrete reality as in the case of God, the angels or the intellect.

See also 
 Azazel
 Samyaza
 Iraq in the Quran
 List of angels in theology
 Lucifer
 Tower of Babel in Islamic tradition
 Watcher (angel)

References

External links 
  Sunni point of vue about Harut et Marut (at-tawhid.net)

Angels in Islam
Articles about multiple people in the Quran
Quranic figures
Fallen angels
Pairs of angels
Babylon